This is a list of international prime ministerial trips made by Magdalena Andersson, who served as the 34th Prime Minister of Sweden from 30 November 2021 to 18 October 2022.

During her premiership, Andersson made 21 trips to 12 countries. The number of visits per country are:
 One visit to the United Kingdom, Denmark, Poland, the United States, Spain, Ukraine and the Czech Republic.
 Two visits to Finland, France, Norway, and Germany.
 Six visits to Belgium.

Trips

2021

2022

Multilateral meetings
Magdalena Andersson participated in the following summits during her prime ministership:

See also 
 Foreign relations of Sweden

References

2021 in international relations
Foreign relations of Sweden
Swedish prime ministerial visits
Andersson